The Udupi Assembly constituency is one of the 224 seats in the Indian state of Karnataka's Assembly (State Assembly). It is part of Udupi Chikmagalur seat of the Lok Sabha (lower house of the national parliament).

Members of Assembly

Election results

2018 Assembly Election

Source: Election Commission of India

1962 Assembly Election

Source: Election Commission of India

1952

See also 
 Udupi district
 List of constituencies of Karnataka Legislative Assembly

References 

Assembly constituencies of Karnataka